Rumo von Ramstein (died ca. 1300) was abbot of the Abbey of Saint Gall from 1274 until 1281.

The monk Rumo was a member of the noble family of Ramstein. He was camerarius, sacristan and deacon under the leadership of Abbot Berchtold von Falkenstein (1244-1272) and his immediate successor, Heinrich III von Wartenberg (1272-1274) until the death of the latter. He was then elected anti-abbot to Ulrich VII von Güttingen (1272-1277). After Ulrich's death, Rumo was universally accepted. He staged an economic buy-out of the abbey while disputes with abbey subjects in Appenzell and the Klostervogt were exacerbating the state of affairs. As a result, Rumo abdicated his position in 1281 for a yearly compensation of 100 marks. The document detailing the amount and origin of his pension is dated 15 January 1282. It is the first reference in a document of cheese from the region of Appenzell, as the abbot was to be given 60 cheese loaves a year from the village of Gais, each roughly worth eight denarii. Rumo died between 1297 and 1303.

Reading list 
 Georg von Wildenstein. In: Helvetia Sacra. III/1/2 (1986), p. 1305-6.
 Harter, Hans: Adel und Burgen im oberen Kinziggebiet. Studien zur Besiedlung und hochmittelalterlichen Herrschaftsbildung im mittelalterlichen Schwarzwald. In: Forschungen zur oberrheinischen Landesgeschichte. 37, Freiburg i. Br./München 1992.
 Harter, Hans: Adel auf Falkenstein und Schilteck. in: Schramberg. Herrschaft – Markflecken – Industriestadt. Museums- und Geschichtsverein Schramberg u. d. Großen Kreisstadt Schramberg, Schramberg 2004, p. 55–82.

References

External links 
 
 Abt Rumo von Ramstein (1274–1281) in the city lexicon of Wil.

Abbots of Saint Gall

13th-century births
1300 deaths
Year of death uncertain
Year of birth unknown